Sergio Barcia Laranxeira (born 31 December 2000) is a Spanish professional footballer who plays as a central defender for Celta B.

Club career
Barcia was born in Vigo, Galicia, and joined RC Celta de Vigo's youth setup in 2010, aged nine, from Club Colegio Hogar. On 23 August 2019, after finishing his formation, he was loaned to Tercera División side Ourense CF for the season.

Barcia made his senior debut on 1 September 2019, playing 31 minutes in a 2–0 away loss against Deportivo Fabril. He was a regular starter during the campaign, appearing in 26 matches as his side missed out promotion in the play-offs.

On 31 August 2020, Barcia signed a three-year contract with Granada CF and was initially assigned to the reserves in Segunda División B. He made his first team – and La Liga – debut on 8 November, starting in a 2–0 away loss against Real Sociedad, as his side was heavily impacted by the COVID-19 pandemic.

References

External links

2000 births
Living people
Footballers from Vigo
Spanish footballers
Association football defenders
Tercera División players
Segunda División B players
La Liga players
Segunda Federación players
Celta de Vigo B players
Club Recreativo Granada players
Granada CF footballers